Hey You is a 2022 Nigerian Romantic comedy film written and directed by Uyoyou Adia and produced by Victoria Akujobi under the Anthill Production Studio. The film stars Temitope Olowoniyan, Rotimi Salami, Miriam Peters and Seyi Awolowo.

Synopsis 
The life of a young software engineer crumbled when he discovered that his crush is an adult film model.

Premiere 
The film was released in cinemas across Nigeria on July 29, 2022.

Cast 
Timini Egbuson, Efe Irele, Rotimi Salami, Stan Nze, Tope Olowoniyan, Miriam Peters, Tunbosun Aiyedehin and Seyi Awolowo.

References 

2022 films
English-language Nigerian films
Nigerian romantic comedy films
2022 romantic comedy films
2020s English-language films